Jere is a masculine given name and a surname. The given name is often a short form of names such as Jerald or Jeremiah.

Given name
 Empress Xiaoduanwen (1600–1649), personal name Jere (or Jerjer), Empress Consort of Hong Taiji of the Qing Dynasty
 Jere Abbott (1897–1982), American art historian and first associate director of the Museum of Modern Art
 Jere Allen, American painter and former art professor
 Jere L. Bacharach (born 1938), American history professor emeritus
 Jere Baxter (1852–1904), American businessman, lawyer and politician
 Jere Beasley (born 1935), American attorney and politician
 Jere Bergius (born 1987), Finnish pole vaulter
 Jere Brophy, American educational psychologist
 Jere Cooper (1893–1957), American politician
 Jere Gillis (born 1957), American National Hockey League player
 Jere Hård (born 1978), Finnish swimmer
 Jere Hargrove (born 1946), American politician
 Jere T. Humphreys (born 1949), American music scholar
 Jere Karalahti (born 1975), Finnish ice hockey player
 Jere Karjalainen (born 1992), Finnish ice hockey player
 Jere Laaksonen (born 1991), Finnish ice hockey player
 Jere Lehtinen (born 1973), Finnish National Hockey League player
 Jere H. Lipps (born 1939), American paleontologist, academic and skeptic
 Jere Michael (born 1977), American figure skater
 Jere Morehead, American lawyer, law professor and President of the University of Georgia
 Jere Myllyniemi (born 1983), Finnish ice hockey player
 Jere Ölander (born 1989), Finnish ice hockey player
 Jere Osgood (born 1936), American furniture maker and teacher
 Jere Pulli (born 1991), Finnish ice hockey player
 Jere Ratcliffe, Chief Scout Executive (1993–2000) of the Boy Scouts of America
 Jere Sallinen (born 1990), Finnish ice hockey player
 Jere Schuler (born 1934), American politician
 Jere Seppälä (born 1993), Finnish ice hockey player
 Jere Strittmatter (born 1950), American politician
 Jere Uronen (born 1994), Finnish footballer
 Jere Wood, mayor of Roswell, Georgia, United States

Surname 
 Besnat Jere, Zambian politician, member of the Pan-African Parliament
 Dickson Jere, Zambian lawyer, journalist, author and political analyst
 Otria Moyo Jere (born 1959), Malawian politician, Deputy Minister of Education, Science and Technology beginning 2009

References 

Finnish masculine given names